Spiaggia libera is a 1965 Italian comedy film directed by Marino Girolami.

Cast
 Dominique Boschero: Pallina 
 Riccardo Garrone: Riccardo 
 Aldo Giuffrè: Cuccurallo   
 Aroldo Tieri: Mario 
 Raimondo Vianello: Captain Oliviero 
 Alberto Lupo: The Engineer
 Sandra Mondaini: Maria  
 Franca Polesello: Friend of Anna 
 Toni Ucci: Nando  
 Enzo Andronico: Maresciallo  
 Ennio Girolami: Ciccio  
 Francesco Mulé: False Priest 
 Luigi Pavese:  Colonel  
 Nietta Zocchi:  Countess

External links
 

1965 films
1960s Italian-language films
1965 comedy films
Films directed by Marino Girolami
Italian comedy films
Films with screenplays by Marino Girolami
1960s Italian films